This is a list of serving senior officers of the Royal Marines. It includes currently serving Royal Marine generals, lieutenant-generals, major-generals and brigadiers.

Generals

Lieutenant-Generals

Major-Generals

Brigadiers

Acting

See also

 List of Royal Marines full generals
 List of serving senior officers of the Royal Navy
 List of serving senior officers of the British Army
 List of serving senior officers of the Royal Air Force

References

Royal Marines
Royal Marines generals
Lists of Royal Navy personnel
Royal Marines